The Nursing Home Reform Act is a part of the Omnibus Budget Reconciliation Act of 1987 which gives guidelines to regulate nursing home care in the United States. The act was intended to advance nursing home residents' rights.

Background
A 1986 study organized by the Institute of Medicine found that people in nursing homes were not getting fair or adequate health care or personal treatment. The Institute of Medicine responded to the study by proposing broad and deep reforms in the regulation of nursing homes. These reforms were integrated into the Omnibus Budget Reconciliation Act of 1987 and passed as part of that law.

The Nursing Home Reform Act provides guidelines and minimal standards which nursing homes must meet. It also created a Nursing Home Residents' Bill of Rights.

Impact
A 2004 survey reported a range of improvements attributed to the act.

A 2007 study by the Kaiser Family Foundation reviewed outcomes of the act.

See also 
 Health and Hospital Corporation of Marion County v. Talevski (2023)

References 

Nursing homes in the United States
1987 in law
1987
1987 in economics
100th United States Congress
Medicare and Medicaid (United States)
United States federal health legislation